This was the first edition of the tournament.

Riccardo Ghedin and Alessandro Motti won the title after defeating Lucas Miedler and Mark Vervoort 6–4, 6–4 in the final.

Seeds

Draw

References
 Main Draw

Adriatic Challenger - Doubles